Hyde County is the name of two counties in the United States:

Hyde County, North Carolina 
Hyde County, South Dakota